Innovative Field (originally known as Frontier Field) is a baseball stadium located at One Morrie Silver Way in downtown Rochester, New York. It has been the home of the Rochester Red Wings of the International League since 1997. The park opened in 1996, replacing Silver Stadium in northern Rochester, which had been home to professional baseball in Rochester since 1929. Although the stadium was built for baseball, Innovative Field has had several tenants in numerous sports, including the Rochester Raging Rhinos of the United Soccer Leagues from 1996 to 2005, and the Rochester Rattlers of Major League Lacrosse from 2001 to 2002. The ballpark seats 10,840 spectators for baseball.

Rochester-based telecommunications company Frontier Telephone of Rochester held the naming rights to the ballpark from its opening in 1996 until the 2022 baseball offseason. Originally in December 2015 agreement was reached to maintain the name for a further ten years, however, on October 24, 2022, a new naming rights agreement was reached with Innovative Solutions, a Henrietta-based IT services company at the request of both Innovative and Frontier who was looking to cut back on sponsorship costs after the company filed for bankruptcy in 2020, changing the name of the stadium to Innovative Field pending final approval.

History
Ground was broken on Innovative Field in November 1994. The stadium, designed by Ellerbe Becket, opened on July 11, 1996. Although Innovative Field was always intended to be primarily a baseball facility, it was constructed to be able to accommodate the Rochester Rhinos soccer team as well. The Red Wings moved from Silver Stadium to Innovative Field at the conclusion of the 1996 International League season.

The first event at Innovative Field was a concert by The Beach Boys on July 11, 1996. The facility also hosted the 1996 Drum Corps Associates World Championships on August 31, 1996. The first sporting event was contested the following night as the Rochester Raging Rhinos played the Montreal Impact in an American Professional Soccer League (original A-League) regular season match. Rochester won 3–2 in front of an A-League record 14,717 fans. The first baseball game at the stadium was the 1997 Rochester Red Wings home opener against the Scranton/Wilkes-Barre Red Barons on April 11, 1997. Scranton/Wilkes-Barre won 8–5. Innovative Field hosted the Triple-A All-Star Game on July 12, 2000.

The Rochester Rattlers of Major League Lacrosse played at Innovative Field from 2001 to 2002, when the team moved to Bishop Kearney High School. They moved again to then-PAETEC Park in 2006. The Rhinos played briefly at the University of Rochester's Fauver Stadium before moving to Innovative Field during their inaugural 1996 season. The Rhinos played at the park until 2005, when the team moved to the soccer-specific PAETEC Park (now Marina Auto Stadium) three blocks northwest of Innovative Field.

After the Rhinos left the stadium for PAETEC Park in 2005, the Rochester Red Wings became the sole full-time tenant. As a result, the Wings made upgrades to the park to make the stadium a better baseball facility. The first notable upgrade, the installation of a new  by  video scoreboard in left field, was completed in time for the 2010 season. Originally, a new grass turf was to be installed following the 2006 season to replace the grass that has been beat up over the years from extensive use in baseball, soccer, and lacrosse. No such replacement was made for 2007, but work commenced following that season and a new grass surface with an improved drainage system was installed prior to the 2008 season.

Faced with a requirement of major renovations to PNC Field, the New York Yankees' Triple-A Scranton/Wilkes-Barre Yankees chose to temporarily relocate their operations to Innovative Field for 2012 to allow renovations to their stadium to be completed in one season rather than being spread over two to three years. The team played half its games at Innovative Field sharing the stadium with the Red Wings. While based in Rochester the team was branded as the Empire State Yankees.

In 2020, with the Triple-A baseball season cancelled due to the COVID-19 pandemic, Innovative Field hosted the Toronto Blue Jays taxi squad while the Blue Jays played at Sahlen Field in Buffalo after the government of Canada denied them permission to play at Rogers Centre for the 2020 MLB season due to pandemic restrictions.

Events

Innovative Field hosted the Triple-A All-Star Game on July 12, 2000, with a sellout crowd of 12,810 on hand. The Pacific Coast League All-Stars defeated the International League All-Stars, 8–2. Rochester's Javier De La Hoya was selected as the IL MVP and Pitcher of the Game.

On July 10, 2005 Bryan Adams and Def Leppard held a concert at the facility. The stadium is the annual site of PXY Summer Jam.

In December 2013, the stadium was the host of Frozen Frontier, an outdoor hockey event. A sheet of ice was set up on the field and the Rochester Americans played the Lake Erie Monsters in an American Hockey League game. There were also collegiate and high school games.

Attendance records
On May 6, 2012, a regular season record crowd of 13,584 fans were in attendance to witness Andy Pettitte make a start for the Scranton/Wilkes-Barre Yankees against the Pawtucket Red Sox. The game was originally supposed to be played at Dwyer Stadium in Batavia but was moved due to a high demand of tickets.

On May 18, 2013, the Pepsi Max Field of Dreams Game saw a crowd of 13,718. Local resident Johnny Perotti and his family played alongside players including Frank Thomas, Rickey Henderson, Johnny Bench, Mike Schmidt, Ozzie Smith, Reggie Jackson, and others.

The largest crowd to witness a baseball game at the stadium was when the Red Wings faced their then parent organization, the Baltimore Orioles, in an exhibition game attended by 13,723 people on July 10, 1997.

Soccer
Innovative Field has also hosted soccer matches, including those for the United States national women's soccer team and the National Women's Soccer League.
 In the 1998 Nike Cup team USA played vs. Russia in front of 13,125 in a 4–0 win. In that game, Mia Hamm became the first American, male or female, to reach the milestone of 100 international goals. Also in that tournament Brazil faced off vs Mexico at Frontier Field where Brazil dominated, winning, 11–0. 
 The largest crowd for any event in Innovative Field history was on September 25, 2004, when the United States Women's National Soccer Team played an International Friendly vs Iceland. USA won the game 4–3, in front of 14,870 fans.

With the creation of soccer specific Capelli Sport Stadium a few blocks over, the U.S Women's Soccer Team started playing friendlies there instead.

The first women's professional club soccer game to be played at Innovative Field was a National Women's Soccer League fixture between the Western New York Flash and Seattle Reign FC on July 9, 2016, which had been moved from Capelli Sport Stadium. The selection of Frontier Field, and the decision to use an undersized,  field (under the  minimum width set by the league), was heavily criticized by soccer players and coaches.

References

External links

Official website
Frontier Field Walk of Fame
Photographs of Frontier Field - Rochester Area Ballparks
Frontier Field Views - Ball Parks of the Minor Leagues

Former Major League Lacrosse venues
Lacrosse venues in New York (state)
Sports venues in Rochester, New York
Soccer venues in New York (state)
Baseball venues in New York (state)
Ice hockey venues in New York (state)
Sports venues completed in 1996
International League ballparks
1996 establishments in New York (state)
Outdoor ice hockey venues in the United States
Frontier Communications